Héctor Raúl Mancilla Garcés (12 November 1980) is a Chilean former footballer who played as a striker. A true striker, Mancilla is not "the fastest or most skillful striker but his true threat is his ability to finish the play in short spaces.". He also holds Mexican citizenship.

Club career

Mancilla began his career with Malleco Unido in the Chilean Tercera División. Next he joined Huachipato in 2000. He spent six seasons with Huachipato scoring 37 goals in 106 appearances. Before the 2006 Apertura in Chile, Mancilla was sold to popular Chilean club Colo-Colo. That season, Mancilla scored twelve goals on the way to a championship. Subsequently, Colo-Colo sold many of their players and Mancilla was one of them. He was sold to CD Veracruz for $800,000. He was sold on 16 June 2008 for an undisclosed price to CD Toluca. He is now one of the top scorers of The Mexican league with 11 goals. He won the Apertura 2008 golden boot for most goals scored. He also became the top scorer in Clausura 2009 with 14 goals. On 2011, he became a key player for the Apertura 2011 championship of Tigres UANL. On 2012, he was sold to Atlas de Guadalajara. On 2013, he was transferred to Monarcas Morelia.

Mancilla ended his career with Malleco Unido in the Segunda División Profesional de Chile in 2018, as a way to hnor his mother.

International career
Mancilla was part of the Copa America 2004 squad of Chile. After leaving Chile to play in Mexico, he lost his spot in the national team of Chile due to the lack of playing time in Mexico. His great form at Toluca earned him a recall to the Chile national team. He came in as a replacement in the 2–0 victory against Paraguay on 6 June 2009, earning his 4th cap with the national team, and his first in almost five years. He also played three days later against Bolivia.

Honours

Club
Colo-Colo
Primera División de Chile: 2006 Apertura

Toluca
Primera División de México: 2008 Apertura, 2010 Bicentenario

 Tigres UANL
Primera División de México: 2011 Apertura

Morelia
Copa MX: 2013 Apertura

Individual
 Mexican Golden Boot: Primera División de México Apertura 2008
 Mexican Golden Boot: Primera División de México Clausura 2009
 Best Forward of the tournament: Primera División de México Apertura 2008
 Best Forward of the tournament: Primera División de México Clausura 2009

References

External links

1980 births
Living people
Chilean footballers
Chilean expatriate footballers
Chile international footballers
Malleco Unido footballers
C.D. Huachipato footballers
Colo-Colo footballers
C.D. Veracruz footballers
Deportivo Toluca F.C. players
Tigres UANL footballers
Atlas F.C. footballers
Atlético Morelia players
Cúcuta Deportivo footballers
Dorados de Sinaloa footballers
2004 Copa América players
Tercera División de Chile players
Chilean Primera División players
Liga MX players
Ascenso MX players
Categoría Primera B players
Segunda División Profesional de Chile players
Chilean expatriate sportspeople in Mexico
Chilean expatriate sportspeople in Colombia
Expatriate footballers in Mexico
Expatriate footballers in Colombia
Naturalized citizens of Mexico
Association football forwards
Chilean football managers
Chilean expatriate football managers
Expatriate football managers in Mexico